Sheriff Street, known by locals as "Sheriffer" or "The Street", is a street in the north inner city of Dublin, Ireland, lying between East Wall and North Wall and often considered to be part of the North Wall area. It is divided into Sheriff Street Lower (west end) and Sheriff Street Upper (east end).

History
 It is one of a group of streets named after civic offices and concepts: Mayor Street, Guild Street, Harbourmaster Place and Commons Street are all nearby. 

The Sheriff Street area might be defined as Upper and Lower Sheriff Street, Mayor Street, Guild Street, Commons Street, Oriel Street, Seville Place, Crinan Strand and Mariner's Port. One of the most visible buildings is St. Laurence O'Toole's Roman Catholic church, which was built in the 1840s and officially opened in 1853, and is accessible via Seville Place. Traditionally, work on Dublin's docks provided employment for local men, but the arrival of containerization led to mass unemployment in the late 1980s.

Sheriff Street has a reputation as a run-down area with a high crime rate. the area was for many years notable for the Sheriff Street flats which consisted of St Laurence's Mansions, St Bridget's Gardens and Phil Shanahan House. Issues with poverty and crime peaked during the heroin epidemic of the 1980s and 1990s. In the late 1990s, the flats were demolished and the area underwent gentrification. Many residents of the flats were housed nearby whilst others left the area. Many of the now gentrified buildings, constructed on the former site of the flats, are accessible on Mayor Street. Lower Sheriff Street remains a working class area consisting of houses. Noctors's Pub is a longstanding business in the area.

In the media
In 1973, RTÉ Radio 1 producer, Seán Mac Réamoinn set out to capture life in the North Wall and Sheriff Street area of the city in a radio documentary, Inner City Island, looking to the past, present and future, which aired on RTÉ Radio 1 on 17 March 2009. Parts of the film In The Name Of The Father were shot in Sheriff Street in the early 1990s, as well as the film The Commitments.

Notable people

 Luke Kelly of the band The Dubliners was born in Lattimore Cottages, 1 Sheriff Street. His place of birth has since been demolished. 
 Stephen Gately, Boyzone
 Jim Sheridan

References

Dublin Docklands
Streets in Dublin (city)